Stavanger Socialdemokrat was a Norwegian newspaper, published in Stavanger in Rogaland county. It was affiliated with the Social Democratic Labour Party of Norway.

Stavanger Socialdemokrat was started in 1921, the same year the Social Democratic Labour Party broke away from the Norwegian Labour Party. In 1927 the Social Democratic Labour Party reconciled with the Labour Party, and the two parties again became one. At the same time, Stavanger Socialdemokrat ceased to exist.

References

1921 establishments in Norway
1927 disestablishments in Norway
Defunct newspapers published in Norway
Mass media in Stavanger
Norwegian-language newspapers
Publications established in 1921
Publications disestablished in 1927
Social Democratic Labour Party of Norway newspapers